Gemini Mountains is a rural locality in the Isaac Region, Queensland, Australia.

Geography 
The Goonyella railway line forms most of the western boundary of the locality, with Mount McLaren railway station serving Graincorp's grain handling facility.

One of the four segments of the Peak Range National Park is in the south of the locality.

The locality contains the following mountains:

 Fletchers Awl 
 Mount Castor 
 Mount Commissioner 
 Mount Mclaren 
 Mount Pollux 
 Mount Saddleback 
 Red Riding Hood 
The land use is predominantly crop growing with some grazing on native vegetation.

History 
The locality takes its name from the mountain range Gemini Mountains,  which consists of two volcanic peaks, Mount Castor and Mount Pollux. Castor and Pollux were the Gemini twins in Greek and Roman mythology.

Education 
There are no schools in Gemini Mountains. The nearest government primary schools are:

 Moranbah State School in Moranbah to the north
 Dysart State School in neighbouring Dysart to the east
 Clermont State School in Clermont to the south
 Kilcummin State School in neighbouring Kilcummin to the west.

The nearest government secondary schools are:

 Moranbah State High School in Moranbah to the north
 Dysart State High School in neighbouring Dysart to the east
 Clermont State High School in Clemont to the south

References 

Isaac Region
Localities in Queensland